Adelheid Dietrich (1827–1891) was a German still life painter and daughter of painter Eduard Dietrich (1803–1877).

Life
She was born in Wittenberg, Germany, and painted flowers in fine detail in a manner resembling that of seventeenth-century Dutch still-life painters. 

About fifty of her works are known today. Her work is held in the National Gallery of Art.

Works

See also
 List of German women artists

References

External links
http://www.the-athenaeum.org/art/list.php?m=a&s=tu&aid=782
http://www.christies.com/lotfinder/paintings/adelheid-dietrich-still-life-with-flowers-5508951-details.aspx
https://www.bonhams.com/auctions/13784/lot/1008/

1827 births
1891 deaths
19th-century German women artists
German women painters
People from Wittenberg
Still life painters